Queen's High School is a state single-sex girls' secondary school in Dunedin.

It is located at the southern end of the city close to the boundary between the suburbs of St Clair and Forbury, next to the parallel single-sex boys' school, King's, with which it shares some facilities.

Pat Harrison (later Dame Pat) was principal of the school from 1975 to 1994.

References

Secondary schools in Dunedin
Girls' schools in New Zealand
Educational institutions established in 1955
1955 establishments in New Zealand